Dzihunia is a genus of stone loaches native to Central Asia.

Species
There are currently three recognized species in this genus:
 Dzihunia amudarjensis (Rass (ru), 1929) (Bukhara stone loach)
 Dzihunia ilan (Turdakov, 1936)
 Dzihunia turdakovi Prokofiev, 2003

On the other hand, in a recent molecular study on DNA barcoding in fish from Uzbekistan, it was found that the species diversity of Dzihunia is more than three, as previously believed.

References

Nemacheilidae
Fish of Asia